The 36th Street Portal is a SEPTA subway–surface lines trolley station in Philadelphia serving Route 10. The station is located at the corner of 36th and Ludlow streets, one block from Market Street. The station is located at a tunnel portal that connects with trackage for the other subway–surface lines.

The station is two blocks north of 36th Street station, an underground station serving the remaining subway–surface routes.

History 

The portal station was opened on October 17, 1955 by the Philadelphia Transportation Company (PTC) as part of a larger project to move portions of the elevated Market Street Line and surface trolleys underground. The original project to bury the elevated tracks between 23rd to 46th streets was announced by the PTC's predecessor, the Philadelphia Rapid Transit Company (PRT), in the 1920s, but was delayed due to the Great Depression and World War II. The PTC's revised project also included a new tunnel for subway–surface trolleys underneath the campus of the University of Pennsylvania, continuing from the original western portal at 23rd and Market streets to the 36th Street Portal, as well as to 40th Street and Baltimore Avenue for other trolley routes besides the 10.

However, service to the vicinity of 36th and Market streets has existed long before then, as the Route 10 was established in its original form by the PRT in 1906.

Station layout 
West of the station, Route 10 runs on surface streets through West Philadelphia to the Overbrook section of the city. East of the station, trolleys enter the tunnel and continue to Center City Philadelphia.

References

External links 
 
 Flickr – 36th Street Portal images
 
 

SEPTA Subway–Surface Trolley Line stations
Railway stations in Philadelphia
Railway stations in the United States opened in 1955
1955 establishments in Pennsylvania